Doleham railway station is a small, single-platform wayside halt in Doleham, East Sussex, England. It is on the Marshlink line, and train services are provided by Southern. The station is very isolated and serves only a handful of houses in the immediate area. There is an approximate daily figure of 8 passengers a day pre-covid.

History
The station opened as Guestling Halt on 1 July 1907 after the South Eastern and Chatham Railway had introduced a steam railcar service on the line in order to improve traffic. It was one of the few places along the line between Hastings and  that could access the railway by a public road. The station was renamed Doleham Halt in 1909 as Guestling was more conveniently accessed from the previous station, .

By 1913, the station was being served by ten rail cars a day. This dropped to about seven per day in the inter-war period.

The "halt" suffix was dropped on 5 May 1969. The station had two platforms until 1979 when the line through the station was singled; as a result, all trains now use the former "up" (Ashford-bound) platform.

Services
Owing to low patronage, the station is only served by a handful of trains each way, with no services at all during the off-peak period. It is the least used station in East Sussex and all of Sussex.

There is one train to Ashford during the afternoon peak, and one train each way (to Hastings and Ashford) in the late evening. This gives a total of three daily services northbound and four services southbound on a weekday. At weekends, there is only one train each way in the morning and one each way in the evening.

Prior to December 2005, the station used to be served by hourly services between Ashford and Hastings. The frequency of stops was reduced when these services were extended to run through to Brighton, due to low patronage, a desire to reduce journeys times on the route through to Brighton, and a need to maintain schedules on the single-track section between Appledore and Ore. There is an ongoing local campaign which seeks to restore regular services to this station, as well as neighbouring stations at Three Oaks and Winchelsea.

In 2011, a local newspaper observed that because of the inconvenient stops and lack of access, Doleham could be technically interpreted as the most crime-ridden station in Sussex as there was one reported crime for every 473 passengers. By comparison, the more likely candidate, only recorded one crime per 43,873 passengers.

References
Citations

Sources

External links
 Doleham - Least Used Station in East Sussex

Railway stations in East Sussex
DfT Category F2 stations
Former South Eastern Railway (UK) stations
Railway stations in Great Britain opened in 1907
Railway stations served by Govia Thameslink Railway
Rother District